Bathtime in Clerkenwell is a 2002 animated, short film written and directed by Alex Budovsky. The film was inspired by the song of the same title composed by Stephen Coates and performed by  The Real Tuesday Weld.

Awards

References

External links
 

2002 short films
2002 films
American animated short films
Animated films without speech
2000s American films